Naoya Masuda (益田 直也, born October 25, 1989 in Kinokawa, Wakayama) is a Japanese professional baseball pitcher for the Chiba Lotte Marines of Japan's Nippon Professional Baseball.

Career
In the 2021 season, Masuda set a Marines club record for saves, with 38, while posting a 2.24 ERA with 68 strikeouts and earning NPB All-Star honors on the year.

References

External links

Nippon Professional Baseball

1989 births
Living people
Baseball people from Wakayama Prefecture
People from Kinokawa, Wakayama
Japanese baseball players
Chiba Lotte Marines players
Nippon Professional Baseball Rookie of the Year Award winners